The following highways have been numbered 74:

Canada
 Newfoundland and Labrador Route 74

India
National Highway 74 (India)

Korea, South
National Route 74

Mexico
 Mexican Federal Highway 74

New Zealand
 New Zealand State Highway 74
 New Zealand State Highway 74A

Philippines
 N74 highway (Philippines)

Taiwan

  Provincial Highway 74 (Taiwan), the longest provincial highway in Taiwan.

United Kingdom
 M74 motorway
 A74 road

United States
 Interstate 74
 U.S. Route 74
 Alabama State Route 74
 Arizona State Route 74
 Arkansas Highway 74
 California State Route 74
 Colorado State Highway 74
 Connecticut Route 74
 Florida State Road 74 (former)
 County Road 74 (Charlotte County, Florida)
 County Road 74 (Glades County, Florida)
 Georgia State Route 74
 Idaho State Highway 74
 Illinois Route 74 (former)
 Iowa Highway 74 (1920–1941) (former)
 K-74 (Kansas highway)
 Kentucky Route 74
 Louisiana Highway 74
 Louisiana State Route 74 (former)
 Maryland Route 74 (former)
 M-74 (Michigan highway)
 Minnesota State Highway 74
 County Road 74 (Dakota County, Minnesota)
 Missouri Route 74
 Nebraska Highway 74
 Nevada State Route 74 (former)
 New Jersey Route 74 (former)
 County Route 74 (Bergen County, New Jersey)
 New Mexico State Road 74
 New York State Route 74
 County Route 74 (Dutchess County, New York)
 County Route 74 (Herkimer County, New York)
 County Route 74 (Madison County, New York)
 County Route 74A (Oneida County, New York)
 County Route 74 (Rensselaer County, New York)
 County Route 74 (Rockland County, New York)
 County Route 74 (Schenectady County, New York)
 County Route 74 (Suffolk County, New York)
 County Route 74 (Sullivan County, New York)
 County Route 74 (Washington County, New York)
 County Route 74A (Washington County, New York)
 North Carolina Highway 74 (temporary)
North Carolina Highway 74 (1921-1934) (former)
 Ohio State Route 74 (1923) (former)
 Oklahoma State Highway 74
 Oklahoma State Highway 74A
 Oklahoma State Highway 74B
 Oklahoma State Highway 74C
 Oklahoma State Highway 74D
 Oklahoma State Highway 74E
 Oklahoma State Highway 74F
 Oregon Route 74
 Pennsylvania Route 74
 Tennessee State Route 74
 Texas State Highway 74 (one former highway; one proposed highway)
Texas State Highway 74A (former)
 Texas State Highway Spur 74
 Farm to Market Road 74
 Texas Park Road 74
 Utah State Route 74
 Vermont Route 74
 Virginia State Route 74
 West Virginia Route 74
 Wisconsin Highway 74
 Wyoming Highway 74

Territories
 U.S. Virgin Islands Highway 74

See also
A74 (disambiguation)